Transducin-like enhancer protein 4 is a protein that in humans is encoded by the TLE4 gene.

Interactions 

TLE4 has been shown to interact with PAX5.

References

Further reading